The 2014 Guzzini Challenger was a professional tennis tournament played on hard courts. It was the twelfth edition of the tournament which was part of the 2014 ATP Challenger Tour. It took place in Recanati, Italy between 14 and 20 July 2014.

Singles main-draw entrants

Seeds

 1 Rankings are as of July 7, 2014.

Other entrants
The following players received wildcards into the singles main draw:
  Salvatore Caruso
  Antonio Massara
  Giacomo Miccini
  Stefano Napolitano

The following player received a special exemption into the singles main draw:
  Kyle Edmund

The following player got into the singles main draw via protected ranking:
  Sergei Bubka

The following players received entry from the qualifying draw:
  Victor Baluda
  Duilio Beretta
  Guillermo Durán
  Filip Veger

Doubles main-draw entrants

Seeds

1 Rankings as of July 7, 2014.

Other entrants
The following pairs received wildcards into the doubles main draw:
  Salvatore Caruso /  Stefano Napolitano
  Edoardo Castagna /  Paride Mangiaterra
  Lorenzo Frigerio /  Matteo Trevisan

The following pair got into the singles main draw via protected ranking:
  Ričardas Berankis /  Sergei Bubka

Champions

Singles

  Gilles Müller def.  Ilija Bozoljac 6–1, 6–2

Doubles

  Ilija Bozoljac /  Goran Tošić def.  James Cluskey /  Laurynas Grigelis 5–7, 6–4, [10–5]

External links
Official Website

Guzzini Challenger
Guzzini Challenger
2014 in Italian tennis